Ferussaciidae is a family of air-breathing land snails, terrestrial pulmonate gastropod mollusks in the superfamily Achatinoidea. 

This family has no subfamilies. The family name Ferussaciidae is from 1883 and therefore it is more recent than the family name Cecilioididae Mörch, 1864. However, the latter has been declared as a  nomen oblitum because it had not been used for over 100 years. Ferussaciidae has been declared a nomen protectum.

Distribution 
The distribution of Ferussaciidae includes Africa to Europe and the Near East, tropical Americas, Hawaii and tropical Asia.

Fossil record
Cecilioides sommeri is the family's oldest fossil record, dating from the Middle Paleocene of Brazil (Itaboraí Basin).

Anatomy
In this family, the number of haploid chromosomes lies between 26 and 30 (according to the values in this table).

Genera 
Genera within the family Ferussaciidae include: (The following unreferenced, unchecked genera are probably from Schileyko (1999))
 Amphorella Lowe, 1852
 Calaxis Letourneux & Bourguignat, 1887
 Cecilioides Férussac, 1814
Coilostele Benson, 1864
 Conollya Odhner, 1932
 Cylichnidia R. T. Lowe, 1852
 Digoniaxis Jousseaume, 1889
 Ferussacia Risso, 1826 - type genus of the family Ferussaciidae
 Geostilbia Crosse, 1867
 Hohenwartiana Bourguignat, 1864
 Karolus Folin, 1870
 Pseudocalaxis Pallary, 1912
 Sculptiferussacia Germain, 1911

References

Further reading 
 Schileyko A. A. (1999). "Treatise on Recent Terrestrial Pulmonate Molluscs. Part 4 Draparnaudiidae, Caryodidae, Macrocyclidae, Acavidae, Clavatoridae, Dorcasiidae, Sculptariidae, Corillidae, Plectopylidae, Megalobulimidae, Strophocheilidae, Cerionidae, Achatinidae, Subulinidae, Glessulidae, Micractaeonidae, Ferrussaciidae". In: Ruthenica., Supplement, 2(4): 435-564, Moscow, ISSN 0136-0027.

External links